John Moon may refer to:

John A. Moon (1855–1921), U.S. Representative from Tennessee
John W. Moon (1836–1898), U.S. Representative from Michigan
John P. Moon (born 1938), Apple Computers executive
John B. Moon (1849–1915), American lawyer and politician in the Virginia House of Delegates
John Moyne or Moon, MP for Calne